Sanda Thuriya III (Arakanese:စန္ဒာသူရိယ,) was a 36th monarch of the Mrauk-U Dynasty of Arakan. During his reign, Arakan was left without central administration to rule the kingdom.

References

Bibliography
 
 
 
 

Thuriya III
Thuriya III
Thuriya III